The Rock Island Armory 1911 series is a product line of single-action recoil operated semi-automatic pistols. They are designed and manufactured by Armscor in Marikina, Philippines, and distributed in the United States by Armscor USA, located in Pahrump, Nevada. Armscor is an ISO 9001 certified-compliant company.

RIA (Rock Island Armory) 1911s are derivative of the US Military G.I. M1911-A1, the standard issue US Service pistol from 1911 to 1985. Most RIA models are targeted at the low-end price point of the 1911 pistol market and are basic entry level MIL-SPEC versions of the 1911. However, some models offer additional higher-end features.

General specifications
The general specifications for Rock Island Armory 1911 pistols are:

Ordnance grade 4140 chromoly steel steel construction with a cast frame.
100% parts compatibility with US G.I.
Flat grooved steel mainspring housing
Calibers: .45 ACP, 10mm Auto, .40 S&W, .38 Super, 9mm Luger, and .22 TCM
Finishes: blued, Parkerized, nickel, Patriot brown cerakote
Grooved trigger
Approx. 5¼ lb. (23 N) trigger pull
Non-checkered smooth wooden, checkered black rubber or VZ type grips, depending on model
Hard plastic clamshell storage case
Manual

Variants
The Compact model features a skeletonized hammer and beavertail grip safety, while the Tactical model adds a target-grade hammer and trigger, as well as an ambidextrous safety and enhanced contrast iron sights. 

Variants of Rock Island Armory 1911 pistols include:

See also
Colt M1911

References

External links
"Making the Rock Island Armory .45 1911 Pistol Reliable" The Sight .45 ACP website
"Rock Island Armory 1911-A1 'Tactical' Slow Motion Study", YouTube. Retrieved February 23, 2014.

.45 ACP semi-automatic pistols
10mm Auto semi-automatic pistols
.40 S&W semi-automatic pistols
.38 Super semi-automatic pistols
9mm Parabellum semi-automatic pistols
1911 platform